Annik Marguet (born 30 June 1981 in Ménières) is a Swiss sports-shooter. She competed for Switzerland at the 2008 Summer Olympics in the 10m air rifle and 50m rifle three positions events, but did not advance to the final in either.  At the 2012 Summer Olympics she competed in the same events, with the same result.

References

External links 
Website of Annik Marguet

Swiss female sport shooters
Olympic shooters of Switzerland
Shooters at the 2008 Summer Olympics
Shooters at the 2012 Summer Olympics
Sportspeople from the canton of Fribourg
1981 births
Living people
21st-century Swiss women